The United States Post Office building in Minneapolis, Minnesota, also known as the "Old" Federal Building, is a structure listed on the National Register of Historic Places.  It was built from 1912 through 1915 and served as the main post office for Minneapolis until the present-day Minneapolis Post Office building was completed in 1936.  Since then, it has housed a variety of federal offices.

It became a focus for Vietnam War protests during the 1960s and 1970s, when the Armed Forces Examining and Entrance Station was located there.  On April 3, 1968, demonstrators marched from Johnston Hall on the University of Minnesota campus to the Old Federal Building to participate in the Day of Resistance, a protest organized across the country.  More protests ensued over the following years.  On August 17, 1970, at 3 AM, a bomb was set off by the steps of the Second Street entrance.  The explosion caused an estimated $500,000 of damage to the building, injured a security guard, and shattered windows up to several blocks away.

The building was listed on the National Register of Historic Places in 2010.

References

External links
 
 United States General Services Administration description of the building

Buildings and structures in Minneapolis
Government buildings on the National Register of Historic Places in Minnesota
Neoclassical architecture in Minnesota
National Register of Historic Places in Hennepin County, Minnesota
Opposition to United States involvement in the Vietnam War